Georgi Pomashki (born 10 January 1960) is a retired Bulgarian-Greek triple jumper and trainer.

He finished sixth at the 1986 European Indoor Championships, fourth at the 1986 European Championships, eighth at the 1987 European Indoor Championships, and competed at the 1987 World Championships without reaching the final.

He became Bulgarian champion in 1983, before Khristo Markov took five titles in a row, and also became Bulgarian indoor champion in 1985 and 1988. His personal best jump was 17.03 metres, achieved in August 1988 in Budapest; and also 7.95 metres in the long jump, achieved in July 1988 in Pleven.

Pomashki after his retirement he became trainer in Greece. He trained many successful athletes such as Voula Patoulidou, Voula Tsiamita, Olga Vasdeki, Voula Papachristou, Tori Franklin and Miltos Tentoglou. He also took part at the 2019 European Parliament election in Greece with the KKE

References

1960 births
Living people
Bulgarian male triple jumpers
Greek people of Bulgarian descent
World Athletics Championships athletes for Bulgaria